The Mechanics Bank Theater and Convention Center (formerly Bakersfield Civic Auditorium) is a performing arts theater and convention facility located in Bakersfield, California (specifically in the Civic Center, Downtown).  It is adjacent to the Mechanics Bank Arena.

History

The Civic Auditorium was originally constructed in 1962, to attract the convention trade to the city. The first show at the auditorium was the Ice Capades, which was on November 20, 1962. The structure was one of Bakersfield's first buildings constructed in a definitively modern style.  In addition to housing the communities’ musical groups, such as the Bakersfield Symphony Orchestra, it also contained a scenery loft and an orchestra pit, to facilitate Broadway musicals and ballets. 

By 1976, Bakersfield began plans for the facilities' first major expansion. The plan would include construction of a convention center, which would be intertwined with the existing theater. It would also include the construction of a hotel directly adjacent and connected to the theater. The convention center was completed in 1980, but budget problems would delay the hotel until 1993. The name was also changed to the Bakersfield Convention Center.

In 1998, the facility was again modified. The parking lot, located east of the facility, was removed for the construction of the 10,000-seat sports arena. The combined complex was renamed the Centennial Garden and Convention Center. Incorporated in the design of the sports complex was a connection to the exhibit hall. This unique feature allows for the convention center to be used as a staging ground or warm-up facility for events being held in the arena. The entire complex was renamed seven years later, when the city signed a 10-year agreement with Rabobank, to name the complex the Rabobank Arena, Theater and Convention Center.  Following the acquisition of Rabobank, N.A. by Mechanics Bank, the naming rights transferred to Mechanics Bank.

See also
Mechanics Bank Arena
List of convention centers in the United States

References

External links
Rabobank Theater and Convention Center

Buildings and structures in Bakersfield, California
Convention centers in California
Theatres completed in 1962
Tourist attractions in Bakersfield, California